Thomas Risely Griffith (born 1848, d. unknown) was a British colonial official. He served as Administrator of the Seychelles from 1889 to 1895.

Colonial service 
Griffith was an official in British colonial service. He served in the Gambia, where he was Acting Administrator of the Gambia from 27 November 1887 to 6 June 1888. He was appointed as the first Administrator of the Seychelles in February 1889, and served until 1895. During his first six months, Griffith realised that religion was a key social factor for the 16,000 inhabitants of the island, especially in relation to education. His main concern was the creation of a non-denominational school, in which the language of instruction would be English. However, as Griffith was a Protestant, it was impossible to convince the Catholic church that he was not biased. In 1890, Griffith wrote to Sir Daniel Morris to suggest that an experienced botanist come to the Seychelles to run an experimental botanical garden, if finances allowed it.

References 

Date of death unknown
Governors of British Seychelles
Governors of the Gambia
1848 births